HD 191806 b is an exoplanet orbiting HD 191806, a K-type star. It has a minimum mass 8.52 times that of Jupiter. It does not orbit within the habitable zone. In 2022, the inclination and true mass of HD 191806 b were measured via astrometry.

References

External links
 
 

Giant planets
Exoplanets discovered in 2016
Exoplanets detected by radial velocity
Exoplanets detected by astrometry
Cygnus (constellation)